Renata Scotto (born 24 February 1934) is an Italian soprano and opera director.

Recognized for her sense of style, her musicality, and as a remarkable singer-actress, Scotto is considered one of the preeminent singers of her generation.

Since retiring from the stage as a singer in 2002, she has turned successfully to directing opera as well as teaching in Italy and America, along with academic posts at the Accademia Nazionale di Santa Cecilia in Rome and the Juilliard School in New York.

Singing career

Renata Scotto was born in Savona, Italy. She made her operatic debut in her home town on Christmas Eve of 1952 at the age of 18 in front of a sold-out house as Violetta in Verdi's La traviata.The next day, she made her 'official' opera debut at the Teatro Nuovo in Milan as Violetta. Shortly after, she performed in her first Puccini opera, Madama Butterfly, in Savona and was paid twenty-five thousand lire. Both roles would later become closely associated with her name.

In 1953, Scotto auditioned at La Scala for the role of Walter in Catalani's La Wally with Renata Tebaldi and Mario del Monaco. After her audition, one of the judges, the conductor Victor de Sabata, was heard to say, "Forget about the rest." La Wally opened on 7 December 1953 and Scotto was called back for fifteen curtain calls. Tebaldi and Del Monaco each received seven.

Scotto's major breakthrough came in 1957: At the Edinburgh Festival, La Scala performed their production of Bellini's La Sonnambula with Maria Meneghini Callas as Amina. The production was so successful that the company added an unscheduled fifth performance. Callas, who was under contract for four performances, declined to perform in the added performance but allowed the La Scala management, who had announced her for the fifth performance without her consent, to explain her departure from the festival as being due to illness. Scotto, covering the role of Amina, sang the role on 3 September 1957. The performance was a great success, and the 23-year-old Scotto became an international opera star.

In 1961, she performed Amina again at Venice's La Fenice with tenor Alfredo Kraus with whom she shared the same teacher, Mercedes Llopart, and a long professional association.

During the 1960s she became one of the leading singers in the belcanto revival initiated by Callas during the 1950s. She sang Bellini's Zaira and La straniera, plus Giulietta in Bellini's I Capuleti e i Montecchi, Donizetti's Maria di Rohan, Meyerbeer's Robert le Diable (in Italian) and other repertoire rarities. In 1964 she performed with La Scala at the Bolshoi Theatre in Moscow, the first opera company tour to the Soviet Union during the Cold War years.

Her American debut was as Mimì in La bohème at the Lyric Opera of Chicago in 1960, the same year she married violinist Lorenzo Anselmi. The couple have a daughter and a son.
On 13 October 1965, Scotto made her Metropolitan Opera debut as Cio-Cio-San in Madama Butterfly. She went on to sing more than 300 performances in 26 roles at the Met through 1987 and settled to live with her family in nearby Westchester County.

With Luciano Pavarotti she opened the series of Live from the Met telecasts in 1977 with Puccini's La bohème. During the following years she starred in the telecasts of Manon Lescaut, Luisa Miller, Don Carlo, Il trittico, Francesca da Rimini and as Desdemona with Jon Vickers in Verdi's Otello.

She sang regularly at the San Francisco Opera; Chicago Lyric Opera; Dallas Opera; Royal Opera, London; Liceo, Barcelona; La Fenice, Venice; and Teatro Colón, Buenos Aires. In addition she appeared in Madrid, Genoa, Florence, Bologna, Trieste, Palermo, Roma, Berlin, Paris, Miami, Tokyo, Pittsburgh, and Osaka among others.

For more than 40 years, Scotto performed in operas written by 18 composers and her repertoire included some forty-five roles. She is best known for her performances as Violetta in La traviata, Gilda  in Rigoletto, Cio-Cio-San in Madama Butterfly, Mimì (and occasionally Musetta) in La bohème, Lucia in Lucia di Lammermoor, Adina in L'elisir d'amore, Liù in Turandot, Nedda in Pagliacci, all three leading soprano roles in Puccini's Il trittico, Adriana Lecouvreur,  and Francesca in Zandonai's Francesca da Rimini.

She also had success at the Met in Meyerbeer's Le prophète, Ponchielli's La gioconda, as Vitellia in Mozart's La clemenza di Tito. Moving into the heavier Verdi repertoire in the 1970s, she sang Elisabetta in Don Carlo, Luisa Miller, Lady Macbeth, Leonora in Il trovatore and the  Requiem, all under the baton of the Met's music director James Levine.

In the late part of her career, Scotto took on the roles of Fedora (Barcelona, 1988), Charlotte in Massenet's Werther, the Marschallin in Der Rosenkavalier (Charleston Spoleto Festival, 1995 and Catania), Kundry in Parsifal (Schwerin,  1995), Elle in La voix humaine (Florence, 1993; Amsterdam and Barcelona, 1996; Torino, 1999), Madame Flora in The Medium (Torino, 1999) and Klytemnestra in Elektra (Baltimore, 2000 and Sevilla, 2002). Later concert appearances included Berlioz's Les nuits d'été, Lieder of Mahler and Strauss, as well as Schoenberg's Erwartung with the Accademia di Santa Cecilia Orchestra and RAI Orchestra of Torino.

As stage director
 
Scotto's director credits include: Madama Butterfly (Metropolitan Opera, Arena di Verona, Florida Grand Opera, Palm Beach Opera); Bellini's Il pirata (Festival Belliniano, Catania, 1993) and La sonnambula (Catania, 1994); an Emmy Award-winning telecast of La traviata (New York City Opera, 1995); Norma (Finnish National Opera); Adriana Lecouvreur (Santiago, 2002); Lucia di Lammermoor (Music Hall of Thessaloniki, 2004); La Wally (Dallas, Bern); La bohème (Lyric Opera of Chicago, 2007 and Palm Beach Opera, 2009); Turandot (Athens, 2009); La sonnambula (Miami and Michigan Opera Theatre, 2008), and Un ballo in maschera (Lyric Opera of Chicago, 2010).

In February 2008, Scotto hosted an artists' roundtable during the intermission of the Met broadcast of Cilea's Adriana Lecouvreur and in 2009 she returned for another round-table with Natalie Dessay and Juan Diego Florez.

Honors

 2007 – Recipient of the Opera News Award by the Metropolitan Opera Guild.
 2009  – Opera Tampa's Anton Coppola Award for Excellence in the Arts.
 2009  – Honorary doctorate by The Juilliard School.
 She won two Emmys, for the telecast of La Gioconda and her direction of La traviata from NYCO.
 Award Franco Albiatti della Critica Italiana.
 Frankfurter Allgemeine Zeitung award for her interpretation of the Marschallin in Der Rosenkavalier.

Commercial Discography (abridged)
 Bellini: Norma (Troyanos, Giacomini, Plishka; Levine, 1979) CBS
 Cherubini: Médée [in Italian] (Callas, Pirazzini, Picchi; Serafin, 1957) Ricordi/Mercury
 Cilea: Adriana Lecouvreur (Obratzsova, Domingo, Milnes; Levine, 1977) CBS
 Donizetti: Anna Bolena (Marsee, Ramey; Rudel, 1975) [live] Opera Depot
 Donizetti: Lucia di Lammermoor (di Stefano, Bastianini; Sanzogno, 1959) Deutsche Grammophon
 Giordano: Andrea Chénier (Domingo, Milnes; Levine, 1976) RCA
 Leoncavallo: Pagliacci (Carreras, Nurmela, Allen; Muti, 1978) EMI
 Mascagni: Cavalleria rusticana (Domingo, Elvíra; Levine, 1978) RCA
 Meyerbeer: Le prophète (Horne, McCracken, Hines; Lewis, 1976) CBS
 Pergolesi: La serva padrona (Bruscantini; Fasano, p.1960) Ricordi/Mercury
 Puccini: La bohème (Meneguzzer, Poggi, Gobbi; Votto, 1961) Deutsche Grammophon
 Puccini: La bohème (Neblett, Kraus, Milnes, Manuguerra, Plishka; Levine, 1979) EMI
 Puccini: Edgar (Killebrew, Bergonzi, Sardinero; Queler, 1977) [live] CBS
 Puccini: Madama Butterfly (Bergonzi; Barbirolli, 1966) EMI
 Puccini: Madama Butterfly (Knight, Domingo, Wixell; Maazel, 1978) CBS
 Puccini: Suor Angelica (Cotrubaș, Horne; Maazel, 1976) CBS
 Puccini: Il tabarro (Knight, Domingo, Gobbi; Maazel, 1977) CBS
 Puccini: Tosca (Domingo, Bruson; Levine, 1980) EMI
 Puccini: Turandot (Nilsson, Corelli; Molinari-Pradelli, 1965) EMI
 Puccini: Le villi (Domingo, Nucci, Gobbi; Maazel, 1979) CBS
 Refice: Cecilia [abridged] (Theyard; Campori, 1976) [live] VAI
 Respighi: Il tramonto (Fulton, 1982) Vox
 Verdi: Arias (Gavazzeni, 1975) CBS
 Verdi: Arias (Fulton, 1983) Hungaroton
 Verdi: Complete Songs (Washington, Scalera, 1989) [live] Nuovo Era
 Verdi: Nabucco (Luchetti, Manuguerra, Ghiaurov; Muti, 1977–78) EMI
 Verdi: Otello (Domingo, Milnes; Levine, 1978) RCA
 Verdi: Requiem (Baltsa, Luchetti, Nesterenko; Muti, 1978) EMI
 Verdi: Rigoletto (Kraus, Bastianini; Gavazzeni, 1960) Deutsche Grammophon
 Verdi: Rigoletto (Cossotto, Bergonzi, Fischer-Dieskau; Kubelík, 1964) Deutsche Grammophon
 Verdi: La traviata (G.Raimondi, Bastianini; Votto, 1962) Deutsche Grammophon
 Verdi: La traviata (Kraus, Bruson; Muti, 1980) EMI
 Wolf-Ferrari: Il segreto di Susanna (Bruson; Pritchard, 1980) CBS

 "Christmas with Renata Scotto at St Patrick's Cathedral" (Grady; Anselmi, 1981) RCA/VAI
 "French Arias" (Rosekrans, 1987) Hungaroton
 "The French Album--II (Rosekrans, 1988) Hungaroton
 "In Duet" (Freni; Anselmi/Magiera, 1978) Decca
 "Italian Opera Arias" (Gavazzeni, 1974) CBS
 "Live in Paris" (I.Davis, 1983) Etcetera [live]
 "Romantic Opera Duets" (Domingo; Adler, 1978) CBS
 "Serenata" (Atkins, c.1977) CBS

Commercial Videography (abridged) 
 Massenet: Werther (Kraus, Sardinero; Guingal, De Tomasi, 1987) [live]
 Puccini: La bohème [as Mimì] (Niska, Pavarotti, Wixell, Plishka, Tajo; Levine, Melano, 1977) [live]
 Puccini: La bohème [as Musetta] (Stratas, Carreras, Stilwell, Morris; Levine, Zeffirelli, 1982) [live]
 Puccini: Manon Lescaut (Domingo, Elvíra, Capecchi; Levine, Menotti, 1980) [live]
 Puccini: Il trittico (Norden, Taillon, Moldoveanu, Creech, MacNeil, Bacquier; Levine, Melano, 1981) [live]
 Verdi: Don Carlos [in Italian] (Troyanos, Moldoveanu, Milnes, Plishka, Hines; Levine, Dexter, 1980) [live]
 Verdi: Luisa Miller (Kraft, Domingo, Milnes, Giaiotti, Morris; Levine, Merrill, 1979) [live]
 Verdi: Otello (Vickers, MacNeil; Levine, Zeffirelli, 1978) [live]
 Zandonai: Francesca da Rimini (Rom, Domingo, MacNeil, Levine, Faggioni, 1984) [live]

 "Live in Budapest" (Lukács, 1991) [live]
 Tokyo Recital (Fulton, 1984) [live]

References 

 Scotto: More Than a Diva by Renata Scotto and Octavio Roca, Doubleday & Company, Inc, 1984.  
 Konrad Dryden: Riccardo Zandonai, A Biography, Foreword by Renata Scotto, Peter Lang Inc, 1999.

External links

Interview with Renata Scotto, January 21, 1988.
Career assessment by Brian Kellow for Opera News Award 2007
2005 New York Times article on Scotto as teacher
Opera studio Accademia Nazionale Santa Cecilia Rome

1934 births
Living people
People from Savona
Italian operatic sopranos
Emmy Award winners
Italian opera directors
Female opera directors
Academic staff of the Accademia Nazionale di Santa Cecilia
Juilliard School faculty
20th-century Italian women opera singers
Women music educators
Commandeurs of the Ordre des Arts et des Lettres